Opercularia may refer to:

Opercularia (ciliate), a genus of sessiline peritrich ciliates
Opercularia (plant), a genus of plants in the family Rubiaceae